The Takebashi incident was an armed rebellion that occurred on August 23, 1878, in which 260 members of the Imperial Guard of the Imperial Japanese Army mutinied and killed officers. The motivation for the incident was the desire of those individuals to be paid for their part in quelling the Satsuma Rebellion. The rioters were stationed at the Imperial Guard headquarters in Takebashi, which was just north of Akasaka Palace. The rioters were planning on burning down the palace. The government executed 55 of the rioters after putting down the mutiny.

References

1878 in Japan
Conflicts in 1878
19th-century rebellions
August 1878 events
Meiji Restoration
Rebellions in Japan